This is a list of Nigerian films scheduled for theatrical release in 2015.

2015

January–March

April–June

July–September

October–December

Unknown release dates
'76
Heaven's Hell
93 Days
Code of Silence (2015 film)
Dangerous Twins

See also
2015 in Nigeria
List of Nigerian films

References

External links
2015 films at the Internet Movie Database

2015
Lists of 2015 films by country or language
Films